The re-establishment of the hierarchy of the Catholic Church in Scotland took effect on 15 March 1878. This followed the restoration of the English hierarchy in 1850.

The restoration was carried out on the instructions of Pope Leo XIII and was one of the first acts of his papacy.

The "old" hierarchy had ended in 1603 when Archbishop Beaton of the Archdiocese of Glasgow died in Paris. In the intervening period from the Scottish Reformation until the restoration of the hierarchy, Scottish Catholics were ministered to by an underground network of priests (such as Saint John Ogilvie, Martyr) who were overseen by Apostolic prefects and then Apostolic Vicars as the oppression of Catholics became less severe.

The restored hierarchy were members of the Apostolic Vicariate and the territories of the new dioceses and archdioceses were based on the ancient (pre-reformation) ones.

There were two archbishops and four bishops in the new hierarchy:
Archbishop of Saint Andrews and Edinburgh
Bishop of Aberdeen
Bishop of Argyll and the Isles
Bishop of Dunkeld
Bishop of Galloway
Archbishop of Glasgow

The Archdiocese of St Andrews and Edinburgh was to be the Metropolitan See for Scotland with the Archdiocese of Glasgow to be under control of the Holy See.

It was nearly another 100 years before Scotland had its first post-Reformation cardinal appointed. In 1969 Archbishop Gray of St Andrews and Edinburgh was elevated to the rank of Cardinal. Since then Cardinal Winning of Glasgow, and Cardinal O'Brien of St Andrews and Edinburgh have been appointed to the College of Cardinals.

See also
Catholic Church in Scotland
Vicariate Apostolic of Scotland

References

Christianity in Edinburgh
Christianity in Glasgow
Catholic Church in Scotland
19th century in Scotland
1878 in Scotland
Pope Leo XIII
History of Catholicism in Scotland
19th-century Catholicism
1878 in Christianity